La devoradora ("The Devourer") is a 1946 Mexican film featuring María Félix. It was directed by Fernando de Fuentes.

External links
 

1946 films
1940s Spanish-language films
Films directed by Fernando de Fuentes
Mexican black-and-white films
Mexican drama films
1946 drama films
1940s Mexican films